[[File:The street railway review (1891) (14761378642).jpg|thumb|Summer car by Wason Manufacturing Co.<ref name="SRR">[https://archive.org/stream/streetrailwayrev10amer/streetrailwayrev10amer#page/614/mode/1up New Cars for Albany & Hudson Railway & Power Co.] In: Street Railway Review, Vol. 10., No 10, 15 October 1900, p. 614-615.</ref>]]

It operated from 1899 to 1929 between Hudson and Albany. It had stops in 14 villages and at an amusement park on the shore of Kinderhook Lake. The company was created in 1899 by merging three railways as well as several power companies. The railway companies involved were:

 , a street railway in Hudson
 , a steam railroad between Hudson and Niverville
 , an electric railway from Kinderhook and Hudson to Rensselaer and Albany

The line was completed and inaugurated in November 1900 as the first third-rail interurban line in the United States. Due to financial difficulties it was reorganized in 1902 as the Albany and Hudson Railroad (not Railway), and again in 1909 as the Albany Southern Railroad.  In 1924, the line was taken over by Eastern New York Utilities Corp until being decommissioned in 1929.

Much of the route became a part of the Albany-Hudson Electric Trail'', a section of the Empire State Trail, which opened at the end of 2020. Extended sections of the trail are off-road rail trail paths.

References 

Streetcars in New York (state)
Defunct New York (state) railroads
Interurban railways in New York (state)
Railway companies established in 1899
Standard gauge railways in the United States